The little shearwater (Puffinus assimilis) is a small shearwater in the petrel family Procellariidae.  Despite the generic name, it is unrelated to the puffins, which are auks, the only similarity being that they are both burrow-nesting seabirds.

Description
This shearwater has the typically "shearing" flight of the genus, dipping from side to side on stiff wings with few beats, the wingtips almost touching the water, though in light winds it has a more flapping flight than that of its larger relatives. In flight it looks cross-shaped, with its wings held at right angles to the body, its colouration changing from black to white as the black upperparts and white underparts are alternately exposed as it travels low over the sea.

At  in length with a  wingspan, it is like a small Manx shearwater but has proportionally shorter and broader wings, with a pale area on the inner flight feathers. Its bill is more slender than that of Manx, and its dark eye stands out against the surrounding white area.

Taxonomy
mtDNA cytochrome b sequence data indicate that the former North Atlantic little shearwater group (Boyd's shearwater, P. boydi and Barolo shearwater, P. baroli) is closer to Audubon's shearwater (Austin 1996, Heidrich et al. 1998), (although many taxonomists now consider them to be distinct species), and Rapa shearwater (P. myrtae),  being closer to the Newell's and possibly Townsend's shearwater  (Austin et al. 2004). Heinroth's shearwater was also sometimes considered a subspecies of this bird; the relationship between the little and Audubon's shearwater is probably not as close as long believed (Austin 1996, Heidrich et al. 1998, Austin et al. 2001, but see also Penhallurick & Wink 2004, and Rheindt & Austin 2005).  The subantarctic shearwater was also considered conspecific (Onley & Scofield 2007, Gill et al. 2010)

Distribution and habitat
 P. a. assimilis Gould, 1838 — Lord Howe Island and Norfolk Island		
 P. a. haurakiensis Fleming, CA & Serventy, 1943 — northeastern North Island (NZ)		
 P. a. kermadecensis Murphy, 1927	— Kermadec Islands		
 P. a. tunneyi Mathews, 1912 — islands off southwestern Australia

It breeds in colonies on islands and coastal cliffs, nesting in burrows which are only visited at night to avoid predation by large gulls.

Behaviour
This is a gregarious species, which can be seen in large numbers from boats or headlands, especially on migration in autumn.  It feeds on fish and molluscs. It does not follow boats. It is silent at sea, but at night the breeding colonies are alive with raucous cackling calls.

It nests in cavities located in grassy fields or in those found among rocks.

The egg is incubated for 52 to 58 days by both sexes.

References

Austin, Jeremy J. (1996): Molecular Phylogenetics of Puffinus Shearwaters: Preliminary Evidence from Mitochondrial Cytochrome b Gene Sequences. Molecular Phylogenetics and Evolution 6(1): 77–88.  (HTML abstract)
Austin, Jeremy J.; Bretagnolle, Vincent & Pasquet, Eric (2004): A global molecular phylogeny of the small Puffinus shearwaters and implications for systematics of the Little-Audubon's Shearwater complex. Auk 121(3): 847–864. DOI: 10.1642/0004-8038(2004)121[0847:AGMPOT]2.0.CO;2 HTML abstract
Collinson, M. (2006): Splitting headaches? Recent taxonomic changes affecting the British and Western Palaearctic lists. British Birds 99(6): 306–323.
Heidrich, Petra; Amengual, José F. & Wink, Michael (1998): Phylogenetic relationships in Mediterranean and North Atlantic shearwaters (Aves: Procellariidae) based on nucleotide sequences of mtDNA. Biochemical Systematics and Ecology 26(2): 145–170.  PDF fulltext
Penhallurick, John & Wink, Michael (2004): Analysis of the taxonomy and nomenclature of the Procellariformes based on complete nucleotide sequences of the mitochondrial cytochrome b gene. Emu 104(2): 125–147.  (HTML abstract)
Rheindt, F. E. & Austin, Jeremy J. (2005): Major analytical and conceptual shortcomings in a recent taxonomic revision of the Procellariiformes - A reply to Penhallurick and Wink (2004). Emu 105(2): 181–186.  PDF fulltext

little shearwater
Birds of Australia
Birds of New Zealand
little shearwater
little shearwater